Karl Eduard Wilhelm Groener (22 November 1867 – 3 May 1939) was a German general and politician. His organisational and logistical abilities resulted in a successful military career before and during World War I.

After a confrontation with Erich Ludendorff the Quartermaster general of the German Army, Groener was reassigned to a field command. When Ludendorff was dismissed in October 1918, Groener succeeded him. Groener worked with the new Social Democratic president Friedrich Ebert to foil a left-wing take-over during the German Revolution of 1918–19. Under his command, the army bloodily suppressed popular uprisings throughout Germany.

Groener tried to integrate the military, which was dominated by an aristocratic and monarchistic officer corps, into the new republic. After resigning from the army in the summer of 1919, Groener served in several governments of the Weimar Republic as minister of transportation, interior and defence. He was pushed out of the government in 1932 by Kurt von Schleicher, who was working on a pact with the Nazis.

Early life
Wilhelm Groener was born in Ludwigsburg in the Kingdom of Württemberg as the son of Karl Eduard Groener (1837–1893), regimental paymaster, and his wife Auguste (née Boleg, 1825–1907) on 22 November 1867. In 1899, Groener married Helene Geyer (1864–1926) in Schwäbisch Gmünd. They had a daughter, Dorothea Groener-Geyer (b.1900).

Military career

Pre-war
As a captain, he won appointment to the General Staff in 1899 and was attached to the railway section, where he worked for the next 17 years. In 1912, as a lieutenant-colonel, Groener became head of the railway section at the General Staff. His plans for the extension of the railway network and for deployment routes were based the deployment plans of Alfred von Schlieffen, the Chief of the General Staff of the German Army from 1891 to 1906.

World War I

The deployment of millions of troops to the frontier by rail boosted Groener's reputation and he received numerous decorations in 1914. Due to his organisational skills, in December 1915 Groener was put in charge of food deliveries from Romania. In May 1916, he joined the leadership of the newly created  (War Food Ministry).

With Erich Ludendorff, Groener worked on the draft for the Hilfsdienstgesetz (Auxiliary Services Act, 1916), which laid down the conscription of men for the war economy. Groener negotiated with the civilian bureaucracy, unions and representatives of the employers. Despite his efforts to appear neutral to maximise output, he became the target of criticism. Factory owners resented him for accepting the unions as partners. Revolutionary groups used his strict admonishments against those who went on strike while soldiers died at the front to undermine his standing with the workers. The negotiations made the limits of Germany military power obvious to Groener and he began to doubt that Germany could win the war. This caused confrontations with the third Oberste Heeresleitung (OHL, the supreme command of the German army), led by Paul Hindenburg and Ludendorff. On 16 August 1917 he was recalled from his post and reassigned to an operational command. This was seen by the public as a response to his views on social policy.

Groener served for six months at the western front first as the commander of the 33rd Division, and then of the XXV Reserve Corps, where he was able to observe trench warfare and the mood of the troops. In March 1918, he commanded the I Corps during the occupation of Ukraine. On 28 March, he was appointed chief of staff of the army group Heeresgruppe Eichhorn-Kiew. This task required him to deal with organisational and political challenges, in particular confrontations with the army high command of Austria-Hungary and supervising, then reshuffling, the Ukrainian government which needed help against Bolshevik revolutionaries.

End of the war and German revolution

After the dismissal of Erich Ludendorff on 26 October 1918, Groener was recalled and on 29 October appointed as Ludendorff's successor as First Quartermaster General (Deputy Chief of the General Staff) under Field Marshal Paul von Hindenburg. The military situation was becoming untenable and social unrest and rebellion in the German armed forces and the civilian population threatened to break out into revolution. Groener started to prepare the withdrawal and demobilisation of the army. As the revolution spread through Germany in early November, Groener began to see the Emperor, Wilhelm II, as an impediment to saving the monarchy and the integrity of the army. Privately, he felt the Kaiser should sacrifice himself in a hero's death at the front.

On 6 November, Groener reacted indignantly when the Social Democrat Friedrich Ebert suggested that the Kaiser should abdicate. On 9 November, when the Kaiser suggested using the army to crush the revolution at home, Groener advised him to abdicate, because he had lost the confidence of the armed forces.  Groener's goal was to preserve the monarchy, but under a different ruler. He was also in favour of accepting the armistice conditions put to the German government, despite their severe nature.

On the evening of 10 November, Groener contacted the new chancellor, Friedrich Ebert, and concluded the Ebert-Groener pact, which was to remain secret for a number of years. Ebert agreed to suppress the Bolshevik revolutionaries and to maintain the traditional role of the armed forces as a pillar of the German state; Groener promised that the army would support the new government. For this act, Groener earned the enmity of many other military leaders, many of whom sought the retention of the monarchy.

Groener oversaw the retreat and demobilisation of the defeated German army after the signing of the armistice on 11 November 1918. Despite a very tight schedule, the withdrawal was effected without problems. Groener organised the defence of the eastern borders of the  until a peace treaty could be signed. The headquarters of OHL, at Schloss Wilhelmshöhe from 14 November 1918 to 13 February 1919, was moved to Kolberg. Groener also planned for and expected the German peacetime army to be built up to 300,000 in the coming years, a plan that would be ruined by the Treaty of Versailles.

On 23 June 1919, Ebert asked OHL for an opinion on whether the  should sign the Treaty of Versailles. Groener supported signing as he was worried that the unity of the  would be in danger if fighting was resumed, contradicting the officer corps and the views of Walther Reinhardt, the Prussian Minister of War. Hindenburg followed Groener on this issue and when Hindenburg resigned, Groener succeeded him. Groener, who expected to be made a scapegoat, began actively cooperating in this process to save the popular von Hindenburg's reputation, something Ebert immediately noticed. OHL was dissolved as a condition of the treaty, and Groener temporarily took over command at Kolberg. He also supported a senior position for Hans von Seeckt. On 30 September, Groener resigned from the army, against the wishes of Ebert; Groener felt that his pact with the Social Democrats had cost him the trust of many of his fellow officers.

Political career
After his resignation from the army, Groener moved in and out of retirement during the 1920s. Not a member of any party, at Ebert's request he served as Minister of Transport between 1920 and 1923. In 1930, Groener married Ruth Naeher-Glück (born 1894) in Berlin and had a son. This second marriage and the early birth date of his son undermined Groener's relationship with the conservative Hindenburg.

On 8 October 1931 he became acting Interior Minister in the government of Heinrich Brüning and favoured the banning of the Nazi  (SA storm troops). As Interior Minister he was asked to outlaw the SA, whilst his goal as Defence Minister was to integrate it into a national, non-partisan paramilitary force. Kurt von Schleicher, his subordinate at the  wanted to set up a cooperation with the two groups and worked on Hindenburg, to have Groener dismissed. He also allied himself with the NSDAP.

Groener moved to Potsdam-Bornstedt in 1934, where he wrote his memoirs, . Groener died of natural causes in Bornstedt on 3 May 1939. He is buried in the Südwestkirchhof Stahnsdorf, located between Potsdam and Berlin.

Decorations and awards
 Pour le Mérite (11 September 1915)
 Commander of the Military Order of Max Joseph Bavaria
 Officer of the Military Merit Order with Swords (Bavaria)
 Knight of the Military Merit Order (Württemberg)
 Order of the Red Eagle, 2nd class with Crown and Swords (1917)
 Honorary citizen of Ludwigsburg

Notes

References

 Eschenburg, Theodor "The Role of the Personality in the Crisis of the Weimar Republic: Hindenburg, Brüning, Groener, Schleicher" pages 3–50 from Republic to Reich The Making Of The Nazi Revolution edited by Hajo Holborn, New York: Pantheon Books, 1972. 
 Groener, Wilhelm. Lebenserinnerungen: Jugend – Generalstab – Weltkrieg. Edited by Friedrich Frhr. Hiller von Gaertringen. Göttingen: Vandenhoeck und Ruprecht, 1957. 
 Groener-Geyer, Dorothea. General Groener: Soldat und Staatsmann. Frankfurt a. M.: Societäts-Verlag, 1955. 
 Haeussler, Helmut H. General William Groener and the Imperial German Arm. Madison: State Historical Society of Wisconsin for Dept. of History, University of Wisconsin, 1962. Available online:  
 Hürter, Johannes. Wilhelm Groener: Reichswehrminister am Ende der Weimarer Republik (1928–1932). Munich: Oldenbourg, 1993. 
 Rakenius, Gerhard W. Wilhelm Groener als Erster Generalquartiermeister: Die Politik der Obersten Heeresleitung 1918/19. Boppard a.R.: Boldt, 1977. 
 Stoneman, Mark R. Wilhelm Groener, Officering, and the Schlieffen Plan  (PhD) Georgetown University, 2006. 
 Wheeler-Bennett, Sir John. The Nemesis of Power: German Army in Politics, 1918–1945. New York: Palgrave Macmillan Publishing Company, 2005.

External links

 Wilhelm Groener Papers at the Seeley G. Mudd Manuscript Library, Princeton University
 

1867 births
1939 deaths
People from Ludwigsburg
People from the Kingdom of Württemberg
Ministers of the Reichswehr
German Army generals of World War I
Lieutenant generals of Württemberg
Recipients of the Pour le Mérite (military class)
Commanders of the Military Order of Max Joseph
Officers Crosses of the Military Merit Order (Bavaria)
German anti-communists
Interior ministers of Germany
Transport ministers of Germany
Military personnel from Baden-Württemberg